Osvaldo (Torres) Vazquez  (born May 20, 1990) is a Cuban professional baseball catcher for Tigres de Ciego de Avila in the Cuban National Series.

Vazquez played for the Cuba national baseball team at the 2015 World Port Tournament, 2015 Premier12 and 2017 World Baseball Classic.

References

External links

1990 births
Living people
Cuban baseball players
Baseball catchers
Tigres de Ciego de Avila players
2017 World Baseball Classic players
People from Ciego de Ávila